Karmen may refer to:

Karmen (name)
KARMEN (Karlsruhe Rutherford Medium Energy Neutrino experiment), accelerator neutrino experiment
Karmen (album), by Karmen Stavec (2003)

See also
Carmen (disambiguation)